Taco María is a Michelin Guide-starred Mexican restaurant in Costa Mesa, California.

See also 

 List of Mexican restaurants
 List of Michelin starred restaurants in Los Angeles and Southern California

References

External links
 

Michelin Guide starred restaurants in California
2013 establishments in California
Restaurants in Orange County, California
Mexican restaurants in California